Sar Tang-e Bala (also Romanized as Sar Tang-e Bālā) is a village in Rostaq Rural District, Rostaq District, Darab County, Fars Province, Iran. At the 2006 census, its population was 58, in 12 families.

References 

Populated places in Darab County